Bandhi railway station is a railway station located in town of Bandhi, in Shaheed Benazir Abad district, Sindh, Pakistan. It is located around 55 km from Nawabshah.

See also
 List of railway stations in Pakistan
 Pakistan Railways

References

Railway stations in Shaheed Benazir Abad District
Railway stations on Karachi–Peshawar Line (ML 1)